Ellatrivia is a genus of small sea snails, marine gastropod mollusks in the family Triviidae, the false cowries or trivias.

Nomenclature
Under Art. 13.1 of the ICZN Code, the name Ellatrivia is not available from Iredale (1931), because he did not provide a description.

Species
Species within the genus Ellatrivia include:
 † Ellatrivia aequiflora (Laws, 1941) 
 Ellatrivia bipunctata (Odhner, 1917)
 Ellatrivia caelatura (Hedley, 1918)
 Ellatrivia cydarum (C. N. Cate, 1979)
 Ellatrivia detavorai Fehse & Grego, 2010
 Ellatrivia exmouthensis (C. N. Cate, 1979)
 † Ellatrivia kaiparaensis Laws, 1939
 Ellatrivia merces (Iredale, 1924)
 Ellatrivia oryzoidea (Iredale, 1935)
 † Ellatrivia zealandica (Kirk, 1882) 
Species brought into synonymy
 Ellatrivia memorata (Finlay, 1926): synonym of Ellatrivia merces (Iredale, 1924)

References

 Cotton, B. & Godfrey, F.K. 1932. South Australian shells (including descriptions of new genera and species). Part 3. The South Australian Naturalist 13: 35–86, plates 1–4.
 Fehse D. (2002) Beiträge zur Kenntnis der Triviidae (Mollusca: Gastropoda) V. Kritische Beurteilung der Genera und Beschreibung einer neuen Art der Gattung Semitrivia Cossmann, 1903. Acta Conchyliorum 6: 3-48.
 Fehse D. & Grego J. (2010) Contributions to the knowledge of the Triviidae. XVI. Revision of the genus Ellatrivia Iredale, 1931 with the description of a new species (Mollusca: Gastropoda). Visaya 3(1):21-61

External links

Triviidae